Hope Hampton (Mae Elizabeth Hampton; February 19, 1897 – January 23, 1982) was an American silent motion picture actress and producer, who was noted for her seemingly effortless incarnation of siren and flapper types in silent-picture roles during the 1920s. She also at one time was an aspiring opera singer.

Early life
Texas-born, Philadelphia-bred beauty contest winner Hampton  was discovered by U.S. silent cinema pioneer Jules Brulatour while working as an extra for director Maurice Tourneur. She made her screen debut in 1920's A Modern Salome, and went on to feature prominently in several Brulatour-financed films. Her last starring role was in The Road to Reno (1938) with Randolph Scott and Glenda Farrell. In 1923, Hampton wed her manager Brulatour, and they remained married until his death in 1946.

Later life
Hampton was trained as an opera singer by voice teacher Estelle Liebling, the teacher of Beverly Sills. After retiring from motion pictures at the dawn of sound, she turned to opera and made her debut with the Philadelphia Opera in Manon. The idea that she ever toured with the Metropolitan Opera is belied by a look at the company's online archives. She returned to the screen in The Road to Reno (1938), a film directed by her husband. Later she was known as The Duchess of Park Avenue, a leading member of New York's social set.

In 1978, she was crowned Queen of the Beaux Arts Ball. She presided with King Arthur Tracy.

She died of a heart attack at the age of 84.

Personal life
Hampton and Brulatour took a honeymoon trip to Egypt, there a Sheikh offered Brulatour £10,000 British pounds to buy his wife. Brulatour smiled at the Sheikh and told him that Mrs. Brulatour's jewels were worth more than that.

Brulatour also gave Hope Hampton a 5-story home on Park Avenue (built in 1885 and redesigned in 1921 by Emery Roth), which became Tour Hope Hampton and was listed for $9 million in 2016.

Complete filmography

Woman (1918)
A Modern Salome (1920)
The Bait (1921)
Love's Penalty (1921)
Stardust (1922)
The Light in the Dark (1922 short)
Lawful Larceny (1923)
Hollywood (1923) (herself; cameo)
The Gold Diggers (1923)
Does It Pay? (1923)
The Truth About Women (1924)
The Price of a Party (1924)
Fifty-Fifty (1925)
Marionettes (1925 short)
 Lover's Island (1925)
 The Unfair Sex (1926)
Springtime of Love (1927 short)
The Call of the Sea (1927 short) 
The Road to Reno (1938)
Hey, Let's Twist! (1961) (herself; cameo)

References

External links

Hope Hampton: Broadway Photographs(Univ. of South Carolina)

1897 births
1982 deaths
American film actresses
American silent film actresses
Actresses from Texas
20th-century American actresses
American women film producers